Oranais is a cultural region of the Maghreb, located in northwestern Algeria.

Geography
It corresponds roughly to the following wilayas: 
Oran Province
Mostaganem Province
Mascara Province
Sidi Bel Abbès Province
Relizane Province
Aïn Témouchent Province
Tlemcen Province.

The capital of the region is the city of Oran.

See also

References 

Cultural regions of Algeria
Geography of Oran Province
Geography of Mostaganem Province
Geography of Mascara Province
Geography of Sidi Bel Abbès Province
Geography of Relizane Province
Geography of Aïn Témouchent Province
Geography of Tlemcen Province